The J. W. and Ann Lowe Clary House is a historic house at 305 N. East St. in Benton, Arkansas.  It is a two-story wood-frame structure, with an exterior of brick veneer and stucco.  It has a complex roof line with a number of gables, including over a projecting front section and a side porte cochere.  Built in 1926, the building exhibits a predominantly Tudor Revival style, with some Craftsman features, notably exposed rafters under some of its eaves.

The house was listed on the National Register of Historic Places in 1993.

See also
National Register of Historic Places listings in Saline County, Arkansas

References

Houses on the National Register of Historic Places in Arkansas
Tudor Revival architecture in Arkansas
Houses completed in 1926
Houses in Saline County, Arkansas
National Register of Historic Places in Saline County, Arkansas
Benton, Arkansas